Gordon Rossiter, born 27 March 1949, is a British-Swedish artist, living and working in Sweden. Much of his subject matter is inspired by life in the Salvation Army.

Biography 

Gordon Rossiter is well known within the international movement of the Salvation Army, which he has documented through the medium of oil painting and ceramics. Motifs show amongst other things the activities of the Salvation Army, open-air services in the streets and market places, marching bands, songsters and Christmas caroling. He has also portrayed many musicians and soldiers. Besides these subjects Rossiter has a great fascination for landscapes, being inspired by the Scottish Highlands and Swedish forests and lakes. He has also painted many West Country English villages, as well as Swedish villages, in oils and aquarelle.

Rossiter drew his first Salvation Army motif already when he was seven years old, since then, art has been a natural part of his life. After leaving secondary school he studied art at the Royal West of England Academy in Bristol for three years, and went on to complement his education by studying ceramics at Weston-Super-Mare Polytechnic.

Rossiter had his first exhibitions in the late 1970s in the UK, after which he has had exhibitions all over Sweden and the United States, and in conjunction with the Winter Olympics in Hamar, Norway. Many reproductions of his work have been produced in the form of Christmas cards, picture postcards, numbered prints of paintings, wall charts, Advent calendars. Further more his art works have been reproduced in various publications including front pages of the War Cry in Denmark, 
Finland, Norway, Sweden and the UK. Rossiter has illustrated books. He has sculptured the "Hanna Prize", a statuette in the likeness of Hanna Ouchterlony, the woman who took the Salvation Army to Sweden. This prize was awarded during the years 2005-2007. In 2005 the prize was presented to Carolina Kluft  the famous Swedish athlete. These days Gordon Rossiter is an internationally recognised British-Swedish artist and is a member of BUS, the pictorial artists union.

Exhibitions 
 Woodspring Museum and Art Gallery, Somerset, UK, 1977
 Glastonbury, Somerset, UK, 1978
 Weston-super-mare, Somerset, UK, 1978, 1980, 1981
 Wells, Somerset, UK, 1979
 Örserum, Smålandsgården, Sweden, 1981
 Jönköping, Westers Galleri, Sweden, 1982, 1985
 Jönköping, Återvändsgatan, Gordons Galleri, Sweden, 1982-1999
 Jönköping, Galleri Per Brahe, Sweden, 1982,1985, 1988,1990
 New York, USA, Salvation Army Center 52nd Street, 1984
 Örebro, Salvation Army, Sweden, 1986, 1988
 Jönköping, Galleri Blå, Sweden, 1990
 Tranås, Sännevadet, Sweden, 1991
 Vätterbygdens Folkhögskola, Nordic Music Leadership Conference, Sweden, 1993
 Riddersberg Hantverksdagar, Sweden, 1993
 Högabergsgården, Sweden, 1993
 The Winter Olympics, Hamar, Norway, 1994
 Jönköping, Rötter konferens, Sweden, 2002
 Nässjö, Salvation Army, Sweden, 2007, 2008
 Månsarps Missionskyrka, Sweden, 2009
 Jönköping, Rådhusparken, Sweden, 2011
 Jönköpings Läns (County) Museum, "Få skjuts i tiden", Sweden, 2013-2014
 Månsarps Missionskyrka, Sweden, 2015
 Jönköping, Williams Hörna, Salvation Army, Sweden, 1998-2017

Public works 
 William H.P. Brown Photographic Studio, Upminster, Essex, UK,Ceramic sign, 1982
 Frälsningsarméns center, New York, 52nd Street, USA, painting, 1984
 Frälsningsarméns huvudkontor, New York, 14th Street, USA, painting, 1984
 Bilspedition (logistics firm) HQ, Stockholm, Sweden, Triptych Painting "Riddarefjärden", 1987
 The Salvation Army Corps, Jönköping, "100 years jubilee " triptych painting, 1988
 Handelsbanken, Merchant Bank, Jönköping. Painting "Jönköping East", 1988
 The Salvation Army Training College, Moss, Norway, Ceramic sign, 1988
 BPA Painting and Decorating Firm, HQ, Slottsgatan, Jönköping, Wall Painting "The Cat", 1989
 The Salvation Army Officers College, Skepparegatan, Stockholm, Sweden— Painting "With Christ into the future" for the college 75th jubilee, 1990
 The Council House Tranås, Sweden. Painting "Open-air in the Market Place" 1990 
 Sparbanken Swedbank, Tranås, Painting, 1990
 PSR Licensed Conveyancer, Burnham-On-Sea, UK, 6 paintings, 1991
 Återvändsgatan, Jönköping, Sweden, Two Ceramic Villages, 1991
 The Salvation Army, Oslo, Norway, Painting "The 17th of May", 1994
 The Salvation Army Corps, Tranås, Sweden, Painting "Open-air in the Market Place", 1995
 The Salvation Army Camp, Högaberg, Sweden, Ceramic Sculpture "25th Jubilee", 1996
 The Salvation Army Corps 393, Stockholm. Ceramic "The Holy Grail", 2000
 The Salvation Army Family Center, Jönköping. Paintings "Christ´s Bidding" "Children Playing", "Midsummer Girls" "Trying it out", 2000
 The Salvation Army Infants School "Vårsol", Jönköping. Paintings "Children Playing in the Rain" — "Testing the Ice", 2000
 The Salvation Army Chapel, Ågesta, Stockholm. Painting "Save Souls", 2007
 The Salvation Army Temple, Stockholm. Painting "Water Play", 2007
 The Salvation Army Bible Institution, Ågesta, Stockholm. Painting "With Christ into the future", 2007
 The Salvation Army HQ, Stockholm. Ceramic Statuette ”Hanna Ouchterlony”, 2009
 Månsarps Mission Church. Painting ”Månsarps Mission Church”, 2009
 Sundsgårdens School and Treatment Home, Svartsjö, Ekerö, Stockholm.— Triptych ”In Safe Hands”, 2010
 The Salvation Army FAM House,Fristad, Borås, Sweden. Paintings ”Light in the Dark”, ”Fight the Good Fight”,”The Mountains where God lives”, ”St Abbs, the wild sea”, ”St Abbs, the coast”, ”St Abbs, the front”, ”The light house, Jersey.”, 2011–13
 The Salvation Army HQ, Oslo, Norway. Ceramic Statuettes ”Hanna Ouchterlony” —— and ”William Booth”, 2014
 The Salvation Army Corps, Södra Vätterbygden, Painting ”Congress In Kalmar 1985”, 2016

References 
 Nilsson, Sven, Årsringar: Frälsningsarmén i Sverige 1981-2003, FA-Press 2006, sid. 238-239.

References 

1949 births
British artists
Swedish artists
Living people